Noorpur Shahan, Islamabad is a green locality situated between 3rd and 4th avenue of Islamabad, Pakistan. It is also situated near to Quaid-i-Azam University, Islamabad Quaid-i-Azam University and Diplomatic Enclave, Islamabad. Mausoleum of a famous saint Bari Imam is located in this area.

References

Islamabad